Duerr may refer to:

 Al Duerr (born 1951), Canadian politician
 Crescentius Richard Duerr (1922–2005), De La Salle Brother, president of De La Salle University in the Philippines
 Edwin Duerr (1904–1985), theater and radio director
 Justin Duerr (born 1976), American artist

See also
 Dürr
 F. Duerr & Sons
Surnames from nicknames